Všehrdy is the name of two villages in the Czech Republic:

 Všehrdy (Chomutov District)
 Všehrdy (Plzeň-North District)